The Zippe-type centrifuge is a gas centrifuge designed to enrich the rare fissile isotope uranium-235 (235U) from the mixture of isotopes found in naturally occurring uranium compounds. The isotopic separation is based on the slight difference in mass of the isotopes. The Zippe design was originally developed in the Soviet Union by a team led by 60 Austrian and German scientists and engineers captured after World War II, working in detention. In the West (and now generally) the type is known by the name of the man who recreated the technology after his return to the West in 1956, based on his recollection of his work in (and contributions to) the Soviet program, Gernot Zippe.  To the extent that it might be referred to in Soviet/Russian usage by any one person's name, it was known (at least at a somewhat earlier stage of development) as a Kamenev centrifuge (after Evgeni Kamenev).

Background 

Natural uranium consists of three isotopes; the majority (99.274 %) is U-238, while approximately 0.72 % is U-235, fissile by thermal neutrons, and the remaining 0.0055 % is U-234. If natural uranium is enriched to 3 % U-235, it can be used as fuel for light water nuclear reactors. If it is enriched to 90 % uranium-235, it can be used for nuclear weapons.

Centrifuge uranium enrichment  

Enriching uranium is difficult because the isotopes are practically identical in chemistry and very similar in weight: U-235 is only 1.26% lighter than U-238 (note this applies only to uranium metal). Centrifuges need to work with a gas rather than a solid, and the gas used here is uranium hexafluoride. The relative mass difference between 235UF6 and 238UF6 is less than 0.86%. On the other hand, separation efficiency in a centrifuge depends on absolute mass difference. Separation of uranium isotopes requires a centrifuge that can spin at 1,500 revolutions per second (90,000RPM). If we assume a rotor diameter of 20 cm (as in some modern centrifuges), this would correspond to a linear speed of greater than Mach2 in air (Mach1 = sound velocity, in air ca. 340 m/s) and much more in UF6.  For comparison, automatic washing machines operate at only about 12 to 25 revolutions per second (720–1500RPM) during the spin cycle, while turbines in automotive turbochargers can run up to around 2500–3333 revolutions per second (150,000–200,000RPM).

A Zippe-type centrifuge has a hollow, cylindrical rotor filled with gaseous uranium hexafluoride (UF6) A rotating magnetic field at the bottom of the rotor, as used in an electric motor, is able to spin it quickly enough that the UF6 is thrown towards the outer wall, with the 238UF6 enriched in the outermost layer and the 235UF6 enriched at the inside of this layer. The centrifugal force creates a pressure gradient: On the axis of the centrifuge there is practically vacuum, so that no mechanical feedthrough or seal is needed for the gas inlet and outlets; near the wall the UF6 reaches its saturation pressure, which in turn limits the rotation speed, because condensation must be avoided. In the so-called countercurrent centrifuge, the bottom of the gaseous mix can be heated, producing convection currents. But the countercurrent is usually stimulated mechanically by the scoop collecting the enriched fraction. In such a way, the enrichment in each horizontal layer is repeated (and thus multiplied) in the next layer, similarly as in column distillation. One scoop is behind a perforated baffle that rotates with the centrifuge; it collects the 238UF6-rich fraction. The other scoop is without baffle. It slows down the gas rotation and thus increases the pressure towards the inside, so that also  the 235UF6-rich fraction can be collected without pumping. Each centrifuge has one inlet on the axis and two output lines, one collecting the gas at he bottom and one at the top.

Quantitatively, the radial pressure (or density) distribution can be given by

where p is the pressure, r the variable radius and R its maximum, M the molecular mass, ω the angular velocity, k the Boltzmann constant and T the temperature. (This equation is similar to the barometric formula.) Writing this equation for oth isotopes and dividing, gives the (r-dependent) isotope ratio. It only contains ΔM (not the relative mass difference ΔM/M) in the exponent. The radial enrichment factor then results by dividing through the initial isotope ratio. To calculate the total enrichment in a countercurrent centrifuge of height H, one has to add a factor of H/(R√2) in the exponent.   

According to Glaser, early centrifuges had rotor diameters of 7.4 to 15 cm and lengths of 0.3 to 3.2 m, and the peripheral speed was 350 to 500 m/s. The modern centrifuge TC-21 of Urenco has a diameter of 20 cm and a length of more than 5 m, spinning with 770 m/s. Centrus (formerly Usec) plans a centrifuge with 60 cm diameter, 12 m height and 900 m/s peripheral speed.  

A countercurrent of the gas is stimulated either mecanically or (less preferred) by a temperature gradient between the top and bottom of the rotor. With a countercurrent-to-feed ratio of 4, Glaser calculates a separation factor of 1,74 for a TC-21 centrifuge of 5 m height. Lowering this ratio (by increasing the feed) decreases the separation factor but increases the throughput and thus the productivity.  

To reduce friction, the rotor spins in a vacuum. Part of the rotor with the near-by housing acts as a molecular pump, which maintains the vacuum. A magnetic bearing holds the top of the rotor steady, and the only physical contact (necessary only during start-up) is the conical jewel bearing on which the rotor sits.  Both bearings contain measures for damping vibrations. The three gas lines enter the rotor on its axis. 

After the scientists were released from Soviet captivity in 1956, Gernot Zippe was surprised to find that engineers in the West were years behind in their centrifuge technology. He was able to reproduce his design at the University of Virginia in the United States, publishing the results, even though the Soviets had confiscated his notes. Zippe left the United States when he was effectively barred from continuing his research: The Americans classified the work as secret, requiring him either to become a U.S. citizen (he refused), return to Europe, or abandon his research.  He returned to Europe where, during the 1960s, he and his colleagues made the centrifuge more efficient by changing the material of the rotor from aluminium to maraging steel, an alloy with a longer fatigue life and longer breaking length, which allowed higher speed. This improved centrifuge design was long used by the commercial company Urenco to produce enriched uranium fuel for nuclear power stations. More recently, they use (e.g. in their model TC-21) carbon fiber reinforced walls.

The exact details of advanced Zippe-type centrifuges are closely guarded secrets. For example, the efficiency of the centrifuges is improved by increasing their speed of rotation.  To do so, stronger materials, such as carbon fiber-reinforced composite materials, are used; but details of the material and its protection against chemical attacks are proprietary. Such are also the various techniques that are used to avoid forces causing destructive (bending) vibrations: Lengthening of a (countercurrent) centrifuge improves the enrichment exponentially. But it also decreases the frequency of mechanical resonances, which increases the danger of catastrophic failure during start-up (as it happened during the Stuxnet event in Iran). Interrupting the cyclindrical rotor by flexible bellows controls the low-frequency vibrations, and careful speed control during start-up helps to ensure that the centrifuge does not operate too long at speeds where resonance is a problem. But more (proprietary) measures seem necessary. Therefore Russia stayed with "subcritical" centrifuges (i.e., with small lengths around 0,5-1 m), whereas those of Urenco have lengths up to 10 m. 

The Zippe-type centrifuge is difficult to build successfully and requires carefully machined parts.  However, compared to other enrichment methods, it is much cheaper and is faster to set up, consumes much less energy and requires little area for the plant. Therefore it can be built in relative secrecy.  This makes it ideal for covert nuclear-weapons programs and increases the risk of nuclear proliferation.  Centrifuge cascades also have much less material held in the machine at any time than gaseous diffusion plants.

Global usage 
Pakistan's atomic bomb program developed the P1 and P2 centrifuges based on early designs of Urenco; the first two centrifuges that Pakistan deployed in larger numbers but reduce it after 1981 based on estimation require for critical mass. The P1 centrifuge uses an aluminum rotor, and the P2 centrifuge uses a maraging steel rotor, which is stronger, spins faster, and enriches more uranium per machine than the P1. In Pakistan, the Zippe-type centrifuge had a local designation and was known as Centrifuge Khan (after Abdul Qadeer Khan).

Russian sources dispute the account of Soviet centrifuge development given by Gernot Zippe. They cite Max Steenbeck as the German scientist in charge of the German part of the Soviet centrifuge effort, which was started by German refugee Fritz Lange in the 1930s. The Soviets credit Steenbeck, Isaac Kikoin and Evgeni Kamenev with originating different valuable aspects of the design. They state Zippe was engaged in building prototypes for the project for two years from 1953. Since the centrifuge project was top secret the Soviets did not challenge any of Zippe's claims at the time.

Zippe-type centrifuge facilities
 Khan Research Laboratories in Pakistan 
 National Enrichment Facility of Los Alamos National Laboratory in the United States
 Urenco Group in Great Britain, the Netherlands and Germany
 Russia (where it is called Kamenev centrifuge) 
 Iran, North Korea
 France, India, China, Japan

See also 
 Gas centrifuge
 Ultracentrifuge
 Magnetic levitation
 Thrust bearing
 German nuclear weapon project
 Germany and weapons of mass destruction
 Pakistan and weapons of mass destruction
 Netherlands and weapons of mass destruction
 Forced labor of Germans in the Soviet Union
 Russian Alsos
 Stuxnet

References

External links 
The Zippe Type - The Poor Man's Bomb, BBC Radio 4, 19 May 2004
Tracking the technology, Nuclear Engineering International, 31 August 2004
Slender and Elegant, It Fuels the Bomb, The New York Times, March 23, 2004
The Gas Centrifuge and Nuclear Proliferation, Marvin Miller, October 22, 2004
 The gas centrifuge and nuclear weapons proliferation, Houston G. Wood, Alexander Glaser, and R. Scott Kemp, Physics Today page 40, September 2008
 Long-term Energy Security Interests of the United States: Hearing Before the Congressional Subcommittee on Economic Stabilization, December11, 1990 page 140,  John E. Gray, Vice Chairman of the Atlantic Council, citing Nuclear Fuel article Here Comes the Troika whilst testifying before the  Subcommittee on Economic Stabilization (United States House Committee on Banking, Finance and Urbain Affaires)

Centrifuges
Isotope separation
Uranium
Nuclear technology in the Soviet Union
Soviet inventions
Germany–Soviet Union relations
Nuclear technology in Pakistan
Netherlands–Pakistan relations
K
ru:Центрифуга Циппе